The Storm is the seventeenth studio album by American rapper Tech N9ne. It was released on December 9, 2016, by Strange Music. The album features guest appearances from 
Gary Clark, Jr., Problem, Joyner Lucas, Logic, Marsha Ambrosious, Jonathan Davis and Boyz II Men alongside fellow Strange Music rappers such as Krizz Kaliko, Stevie Stone, Murs and Big Scoob, among others.

Singles
The album's lead single, called "Erbody But Me" was released on September 9, 2016. The song features guest appearances from Bizzy, and the Strange Music's label-mate Krizz Kaliko, with the production by Tech N9ne's longtime collaborator Seven.

Response
Tech N9ne was very upset about the mixed reception of the album: "I tried to go back and try to make it a little bit more grittier like my first record, and the response that I got wasn't the one that I wanted. So I was hurt.
I wanted people to respond to a weed song I did with Boyz II Men called "Buddha." Now who could get Boyz II Men on a song called "Buddha?" I finally got to work with Jonathan Davis of Korn. We did "Starting to Turn." It was so humongous. Finally got to work with Gary Clark Jr. and do a song. Very humongous. Nobody — I finally got to work with Marsha Ambrosius of Floetry. I've loved her music for years, since Floetry first dropped. When they wrote the song for Michael Jackson, "Butterfly," I was tuned in. No response. Not the — I mean, my fans bought it. But it was like, "Eh." Broke my heart."

Track listing

Charts

References

2016 albums
Strange Music albums
Tech N9ne albums